Amata rufina is a moth of the family Erebidae. It was described by Oberthür in 1878. It is found in Eritrea and Ethiopia.

References

 Natural History Museum Lepidoptera generic names catalog

rufina
Moths described in 1878
Moths of Africa